Vincent Adewoye (born 23 May 2000) is a Nigerian cricketer. In May 2019, he was named in Nigeria's squad for the Regional Finals of the 2018–19 ICC T20 World Cup Africa Qualifier tournament in Uganda. He made his Twenty20 International (T20I) debut for Nigeria against Kenya on 20 May 2019. In October 2019, he was named in Nigeria's squad for the 2019 ICC T20 World Cup Qualifier tournament in the United Arab Emirates.

References

External links
 

2000 births
Living people
Nigerian cricketers
Nigeria Twenty20 International cricketers
Place of birth missing (living people)